Tata Hall is a building on the campus of the Harvard Business School in Allston, Massachusetts. It was built in part with $50 million from the Tata Group, and named in honor of its former chairman and HBS alumnus Ratan Tata. The project began in 2010, and it was completed in 2013. The building includes a dormitory and classrooms.

References

School buildings completed in 2013
Harvard Business School
Harvard University buildings
2013 establishments in Massachusetts